Charisalia americana is a species of beetle in the family Cerambycidae, the only species in the genus Charisalia.

References

Lepturinae